La Reine Margot is a 1994 historical romantic drama film directed by Patrice Chéreau, from a screenplay he co-wrote with Danièle Thompson, based on the 1845 historical novel of the same name by Alexandre Dumas. The film stars Isabelle Adjani, Daniel Auteuil, Jean-Hugues Anglade, Vincent Perez and Virna Lisi. An abridged version of the film was released as Queen Margot in North America, and in the United Kingdom under its original French title.

It won the Jury Prize and Best Actress Award at the Cannes Film Festival, as well as five César Awards. A restored version was shown as part of the Cannes Classics section of the 2013 Cannes Film Festival.

Plot
During the late 16th century, Catholics and Protestant Huguenots are fighting over political control of France, which is ruled by the neurotic, hypochondriac King Charles IX, and his mother, Catherine de' Medici, a scheming power player. Catherine decides to make an overture of goodwill by offering up her daughter Margot in marriage to Henri de Bourbon, a prominent Huguenot and King of Navarre, although she also schemes to bring about the notorious St. Bartholomew's Day Massacre of 1572, when thousands of Protestants are slaughtered. The marriage goes forward but Margot, who does not love Henri, begins a passionate affair with the soldier La Môle, also a Protestant from a well-to-do family. Murders by poisoning follow, as court intrigues multiply and Queen Catherine's villainous plotting to place her son the Duke of Anjou on the throne threatens the lives of La Môle, Margot and Henri of Navarre. A book with pages painted with arsenic is intended for Henri but instead causes the slow, agonizing death of King Charles. Henri escapes to Navarre and sends La Môle to fetch Margot, but Guise apprehends him. La Môle is beheaded in the Bastille before Margot can save him, and King Charles finally dies. Margot escapes carrying La Môle's embalmed head as Anjou is proclaimed King of France as Henry III.

Cast

Production
The film was an international co-production between by several companies based in France, Germany, and Italy, with the additional participation of StudioCanal and the American company Miramax and the support of Eurimages. Among the locations were the Mafra Palace in Portugal, the Saint-Quentin Basilica, Saint-Quentin, Aisne, and the Château de Maulnes, Cruzy-le-Châtel in France. The organ piece played during the wedding of Margaret of Valois and Henri de Bourbon was recorded by Pierre Pincemaille on the organ of the Basilica of Saint-Denis.

Soundtrack

The La Reine Margot soundtrack was composed by Sarajevo-born composer Goran Bregović. Like most of Bregović's work, the soundtrack's melodies are heavily influenced by the Balkan folk music tradition. Additionally, Bregović refurbished some of his previous work while as the frontman of Yugoslav rock band Bijelo dugme.

Track listing
 "Elo Hi (Canto Nero)" (feat. Ofra Haza) - based on Kada odem, kad me ne bude (chorus) by Bijelo Dugme
 "Rondinella" (feat. Zdravko Čolić)
 "La Nuit De La Saint Barthélémy" (feat. Zdravko Čolić)
 "Le Matin" (feat. Vasilisa)
 "Lullaby"
 "Ruda Neruda" (feat. Zdravko Čolić)
 "U te sam se zaljubija"
 "La Chasse"
 "Margot"
 "Rencontre"
 "Marguerite De Valois Et Henri De Navarre"
 "Le Mariage"
 "La Nuit" (feat. Dusan Prelevic) - based on Ružica by Bijelo Dugme
 "Elo Hi" (feat. Ofra Haza)

Release
The film opened on 13 May 1994 at the 1994 Cannes Film Festival and also opened nationally in France the same day. The version shown at Cannes and for the French theatrical run had a runtime of 162 minutes.

For the film’s North American release, the film's American distributor Miramax chose to market the film as a traditional costume drama, with an emphasis on the romance between Margot and La Môle. Fifteen minutes were cut from Chéreau’s version and a deleted scene of Margot and La Môle wrapped in a red cloak was reinserted. This version was shown in cinemas outside France and later on video. Miramax also changed the image on the poster; the American one features the red cloak scene of the pair of lovers, in contrast to the French poster which shows a shocked Margot in a white dress bespattered with blood. The film grossed over $1.29 million in the U.S. in 1994.

The original full-length version was available for a limited period in the United Kingdom on VHS in a collectors' edition box set in 1995, but all further releases until the blu-ray rerelease in 2014 used the shorter 145-minute cut. The Region 2 European DVD cover also uses the original poster.

Reception
The film grossed 12.7 million French Francs ($2.2 million) in its first five days in France. The following week it was the number one film in France after expanding from 248 to 428 screens. The film had a total of 2,002,915 admissions in France, for a gross of $12.26 million. In Italy, the film grossed over $2 million. In the United States and Canada, the film grossed $2,017,346 in a limited theatrical release. It had admissions of 260,000 in Germany with a gross of $1.33 million and 530,800 admissions in Argentina. It was the highest-grossing non-English language film in the UK during 1995 with a gross of £635,711 ($980,000). In Australia it grossed $890,000. Worldwide, it has grossed over $20 million.

Year-end lists
 Top 10 (listed alphabetically, not ranked) – Mike Clark, USA Today

Accolades

Re-release 
For the film's 20th anniversary, Pathé restored Patrice Chéreau’s original 162-minute cut to 4k definition, and this version was given a limited theatrical release by the Cohen Media Group in 2014. This version received more critical praise than the 1994 Miramax cut, which critics said was confusing and did not give enough time for American audiences to digest various characters and plot lines.

Peter Sobzcynski, writing for RogerEbert.com, said the film is a "go-for-broke, blood-and-thunder saga that is as powerful and provocative today as it was when it was first released—even more so now that it has been returned to its full length", and the fact that it is one of the most expensive French films ever made shows onscreen. Scott Tobias of The Dissolve praised Isabelle Adjani for portraying Margot "as a figure of prismatic emotional and moral complexity, at times aggressive and seemingly reckless in pursuing her romantic and sexual interests, and at others cunning and shrewd in playing the middle of two sides locked in conflict." He noted her "uninhibited performance figures into Chéreau’s approach to history, which couldn’t be further from the decorous reserve and pageantry of other such costume epics." Sobzcynski also commended the film for putting its female characters at the forefront of the plot. J. Hoberman of The New York Times wrote Virna Lisi "gives a harrowing performance as the poisonous Queen Mother." Robert Abele of the Los Angeles Times wrote, "Chéreau’s and screenwriter Danièle Thompson’s lively adaptation of Alexandre Dumas’ novel remains a model of heaving, combustible history, in which period lavishness and performance energy aren’t mutually exclusive. Splendidly acted and tautly executed."

The restoration was released on Blu-ray on August 26, 2014, with a new commentary track by the New York Film Festival's director emeritus Richard Peña.

See also
 French Wars of Religion
 La Reine Margot (1954 film), an earlier film adaption of the novel

References

External links
 
 

1994 films
1994 romantic drama films
1990s historical drama films
1990s historical romance films
Cultural depictions of Catherine de' Medici
Cultural depictions of Henry I, Duke of Guise
Cultural depictions of Henry III of France
Films based on French novels
Films based on works by Alexandre Dumas
Films directed by Patrice Chéreau
Films featuring a Best Actress César Award-winning performance
Films featuring a Best Supporting Actor César Award-winning performance
Films featuring a Best Supporting Actress César Award-winning performance
Films produced by Claude Berri
Films scored by Goran Bregović
Films set in the 1570s
Films set in France
French historical drama films
French historical romance films
1990s French-language films
French romantic drama films
German historical drama films
German historical romance films
German romantic drama films
Incest in film
Italian historical drama films
Italian historical romance films
1990s Italian-language films
Italian romantic drama films
Miramax films
1994 multilingual films
French multilingual films
German multilingual films
Italian multilingual films
1990s French films
1990s German films